Mihragan-kadag (Middle Persian), mentioned in Islamic works in the Arabized forms Mihrajanqadhaq and Mihrajan Qashaq, was a district and province in the western Jibal, on the borders with modern-day Iraq, in the early Middle Ages. Its capital was the town of Saymarah. Various Arab geographers note that the district was fertile and populous. By the 14th century, the town of Saymarah was falling in ruin, and is now deserted.

Sources 
 

Historical regions of Iran
Jibal
Subdivisions of the Sasanian Empire